The Representative Brass Band of the National Guards Unit of Bulgaria is the official representative brass band of the National Guards Unit of the Bulgarian Armed Forces. Stationed in the capital of Sofia, the band works together with the National Guards Unit during events where the President of Bulgaria receives heads of state and government at the Largo in Sofia.

History 

It was commissioned by the Bulgarian Government in 1878, with originally 20 Czech musicians led by Josef Chochola in the band. In 1892 this orchestra was transferred to Sofia from Veliko Tarnovo and was enlisted as part of the Bulgarian Life Guards Squadron. The first ethnic Bulgarian to be appointed as the chief conductor of the band was Maestro Georgi Atanasov. In 1944, after the communist coup, the band was dissolved and the remaining musicians were sent to the town of Breznik. In 1951, the band was restored as the Central Brass Band of the Bulgarian People's Army. Since its restoration, the band's musicians wore regular infantry uniforms instead of the uniform of the guards unit. The guards band was reestablished in 2001, with its former status and original name.

Music 
Most of the pieces of music are performed by the band at the Bulgarian Armed Forces Day parade in Sofia or during official protocol ceremonies.
 Botev's March
 Great are our Soldiers (The official anthem and hymn of the Bulgarian Armed Forces)
 Son’s Duty
 One Legacy
 Near the Bosphorous
 Dobrudzha region
 We are to be victorious
 Festive Sofia

List of conductors 

 Josef Chochola (1878–1895)
 Emanuil Manolov (1895–1914)
 Georgi Atanasov (1914–1920; 1923–1926)
 Nikola Tsonev (?)

See also 
 Representative Central Band of the Romanian Army
 Ottoman military band
 Serbian Guards Unit Band
 Military Band of Athens

References

External links 

 National Guards Unit official page 
 Official site of National Guards Unit.
 A 1988 concert of the band in the Sofia Central Music Hall.
 БНТ Н3Dеля х3 6 mai 2012 Велик е нашият войник
 Концерт на Гвардейски Оркестър

Military bands
National symbols of Bulgaria
Military units and formations of Bulgaria
Musical groups established in 1878